Melkite Greek Catholic Apostolic Exarchate of Argentina is an Apostolic Exarchate (missionary pre-diocesan jurisdiction) of the Melkite Greek Catholic Church covering all of Argentina for its Byzantine Rite.

It is immediately subject to the Melkite Catholic Patriarchate of Antioch. It is currently governed by Bishop Ibrahim Salameh, SMSP.

Territory and statistics

Apostolic Exarchate to the Melkites has jurisdiction over all the faithful of the Melkite Greek Catholic Church in Argentina. Its cathedral episcopal see is the Cathedral of Saint George in the city of Córdoba, Argentina. In 2010 there were 3000 baptized.

Parishes 
The territory is divided into three parishes:

 Saint George Cathedral, Cordoba
 Saint George Church, Rosario
 Our Lady of Perpetual Help Church, Buenos Aires.

History 
In the late of the 19th century began the first Melkite Christians' immigration to Argentina. Two major waves of immigration took place between 1910 and 1930 and from 1949 to 1950. The majority of immigrants came from Lebanon and Syria and settled mostly in Rosario, Buenos Aires and Córdoba.
 
The Apostolic Exarchate was erected on 21 March 2002 with the papal bull Quandoquidem saeculorum of Pope John Paul II.

Ordinaries 
 Apostolic Exarchs of Argentina
 Georges Nicholas Haddad, Society of Missionaries of Saint Paul (SMSP) (20 April 2002 – 19 December 2005 resigned), Titular Bishop of Myra of the Greek-Melkites (20 April 2002 – 17 October 2006), later Apostolic Administrator of Akka of the Greek-Melkites (Israel) (18 March 2003 – 7 February 2006), Archeparch of Bāniyās of the Greek-Melkites (Lebanon) (since 17 October 2006 – ...)
 Jean-Abdo Arbach, Basilian Chouerite Order of Saint John the Baptist (B.C.) (17 October 2006 – 23 June 2012), Titular Bishop of Hilta (17 October 2006 – 11 November 2006), Titular Bishop of Palmyra of the Greek-Melkites (11 November 2006 – 23 June 2012); later Metropolitan Archbishop of Homs of the Greek-Melkites (Syria) (23 June 2012 – ...)
 Ibrahim Salameh, SMSP, (since 15 August 2013 – ...), Titular Bishop of Palmyra of the Greek-Melkites

Sources

 Annuario Pontificio, Libreria Editrice Vaticana, Città del Vaticano, 2003, .

References

External links
 Gcatholic.org
 Catholic-hierarchy.org
 Aicaold.com.ar
 Pgc-lb.org
 Aica.org

Eastern Catholicism in Argentina
Melkite Greek Catholic Church in South America
Melkite Greek Catholic apostolic exarchates